Entertaining Comics, commonly known as EC Comics, was a major publisher of comic books in the 1940s and 1950s. The letters EC originally stood for Educational Comics. EC's Pre-Trend titles are those published by Max Gaines and his son William M. Gaines, who took over the family business after his father's death in 1947.

In 1950, with the addition of writer and artist Al Feldstein, EC found success with their New Trend line, including their horror titles Tales From the Crypt The Haunt of Fear and The Vault of Horror. A line of science fiction titles soon followed, Weird Science and Weird Fantasy, illustrated by the best artists in the business, such as Wallace Wood, Reed Crandall, Johnny Craig, George Evans, Graham Ingels, Jack Davis, Bill Elder, Joe Orlando, Al Williamson and Frank Frazetta. In addition to original stories, the books also featured adaptations of Ray Bradbury's short stories.

The New Direction group was a response to the Comics Code Authority. Picto-Fiction was a short-lived line of heavily illustrated short story magazines. Beginning in 1958, EC published annual and special editions of Mad.

Publications

Pre-Trend

New Trend

New Direction

Picto-Fiction

Mad annuals and specials
 More Trash from Mad, 1958–1969 (12 issues)
 Worst from Mad, 1958–1969 (12 issues)
 Mad Follies, 1963–1969 (7 issues)
 Mad Special, 1970–1973 (10 issues)
 Mad Super Special, 1973–1999 (131 issues)
 Mad XL, 2000–2005 (34 issues)
 Mad Color Classics, 2000–2005 (11 issues)
 Mad Classics, 2005–2009 (25 issues)
 Mad Kids, 2005–2009 (14 issues)

Reprints

Many of these titles were reprinted during the past 30 years by publisher Russ Cochran, both independently and in conjunction with Gladstone Publishing and later with Gemstone Publishing.

Russ Cochran's reprints include The Complete EC Library in black and white but with full-color covers; EC Annuals in full-color, comic-book sized reprints with four to six complete comics in each Annual; and EC Archives, full-color hardcover books containing six complete EC comics.

In 2012 Fantagraphics Books began publishing a series of artist- and theme-based collections of EC stories titled The EC Artists' Library.

The full-color EC Archives project was taken up by Dark Horse Comics in 2013, both reprinting previous Gladstone and Gemstone volumes and producing new volumes collecting further EC Comics titles.

References

EC Comics at the Big Comic Book DataBase

 
EC Comics